Acropteroxys is a genus of lizard beetles in the family Erotylidae. There are at least two described species in Acropteroxys.

Species
These two species belong to the genus Acropteroxys:
 Acropteroxys gracilis (Newman, 1838) i c g b (slender lizard beetle)
 Acropteroxys lecontei (Crotch, 1873) i c g b
Data sources: i = ITIS, c = Catalogue of Life, g = GBIF, b = Bugguide.net

References

Further reading

External links

 

Erotylidae
Articles created by Qbugbot